The Hundsrücken is a mountain in Baden-Württemberg, Germany. It is located in the county of Zollernalbkreis.

Mountains and hills of the Swabian Jura
Zollernalbkreis